Standings and Results for Group C of the Regular Season phase of the 2013–14 Euroleague basketball tournament.

Standings

|}

Fixtures/results
All times given below are in Central European Time.

Game 1

Game 2

Game 3

Game 4

Game 5

Game 6

Game 7

Game 8

Game 9

Game 10

References

External links
Standings
Dailymotion
Dailymotion

2013–14 Euroleague